Albert J. Hopkins (1846–1922) was a U.S. Senator from Illinois from 1903 to 1909. Senator Hopkins may also refer to:

Benjamin F. Hopkins (1829–1870), Wisconsin State Senate
James C. Hopkins (lawyer) (1819–1877), New York State Senate
James G. Hopkins (1801–1860), New York State Senate
Larry J. Hopkins (born 1933), Kentucky State Senate
Peter W. Hopkins (1826–1879), New York State Senate
Samuel M. Hopkins (1772–1837), New York State Senate
Samuel Hopkins (congressman) (1753–1819), Kentucky State Senate
William B. Hopkins (1922–2012), Virginia State Senate